Hungary competed at the 1976 Summer Paralympics in Toronto. Its athletes finished thirtieth in the overall medal count.

See also 
 Hungary at the Paralympics
 Hungary at the 1976 Summer Olympics

References 

Hungary at the Paralympics
1976 in Hungarian sport
Nations at the 1976 Summer Paralympics